PDC World Championship Darts: Pro Tour is a darts simulation video game based on events held by the Professional Darts Corporation (PDC). The game was developed by Rebellion Developments in collaboration with British developer Redoubt, Ltd. and published by O-Games on 26 November 2010 in Europe for the PlayStation 3, Wii and Xbox 360 game consoles.

As well as full compatibility with the standard DualShock 3 controller, the Sony PlayStation 3 version integrates full PlayStation Move compatibility, however, the Xbox 360 version does not incorporate additional Kinect functionality.

O-Games introduced downloadable content that was (and still is) available on the PS3 and Xbox 360 (some of which is exclusive to the PS3) for the game, which offered 2 extra players and a new tournament. The only pack was released on the games release which included dart players Wayne Mardle and Peter Manley and the Las Vegas Desert Classic tournament. 

Upon release, the game was met with a mixed-to-positive reception.

Playable characters
  Phil Taylor
  Raymond van Barneveld
  James Wade
  Mervyn King
  Terry Jenkins
  Ronnie Baxter
  Adrian Lewis
  Colin Lloyd
  Andy Hamilton
  Colin Osborne
  Dennis Priestley
  Robert Thornton
  Simon Whitlock
  Kevin Painter
  Gary Anderson
  Jelle Klaasen
  Wayne Mardle (downloadable pack)
  Peter Manley (downloadable pack)

PDC Tournaments
6 PDC tournaments are included in the game, with an extra tournament as downloadable content.
UK Open
World Matchplay
European Championship
World Grand Prix
Grand Slam of Darts
PDC World Darts Championship
Las Vegas Desert Classic

The atmosphere has been further enhanced with an all-new commentary from Sid Waddell and John Gwynne, top level match referees, Bruce Spendley and Russ Bray and Master of Ceremonies, John McDonald.

  Wayne Mardle, Peter Manley and the Las Vegas Desert Classic must be downloaded in order to play them

2010 video games
Darts video games
PlayStation 3 games
Video games developed in the United Kingdom
Wii games
Xbox 360 games
Professional Darts Corporation